Thawi Watthana is one of the 50 districts (khet) of Bangkok, Thailand. Its neighbor, clockwise from north, are Bang Kruai district of Nonthaburi province, Taling Chan, Bang Khae, and Nong Khaem Districts of Bangkok, Sam Phran and Phutthamonthon of Nakhon Pathom province.

History
The district is named after Khlong Thawi Watthana, a very long khlong (canal) that runs roughly northwest-southeast through the area. It was a tambon, part of Taling Chan district of Thonburi Province in 1933. It was promoted to a district effective 6 March 1998.

Administration
The district is divided into two sub-districts (khwaeng).

Places
Utthayan Road (ถนนอุทยาน), the road toward Phutthamonthon which is 90 m wide, about 3,861 m long, and divided into the central avenue and two parallel lanes along both sides. The road was planned as part of the grand Phutthamonthon project of Field Marshal Plaek Pibulsonggram, the then prime minister, during the 1950s. The project was stalled when he went out of office and only resumed and opened on 27 February 1999.

Siamese Cat Park (อุทยานแมวไทยโบราณ) is a farm where a rare breed of Siamese cats named Khao Manee (ขาวมณี) are kept and maintained. The cats are white and odd-eyed, i.e., left and right eyes have different colors. The possible eye colors are emerald, yellow sapphire, amber, brown, grey, diamond, blue, and light blue. It descends from royal felines of King Chulalongkorn where only nine were left before the attempt to preserve this breed was initiated by the king. Later, the park was moved to Thawi Watthana Road (ถนนทวีวัฒนา). Now it has closed down.

Thon Buri Market (ตลาดนัดธนบุรี) is a market selling agriculture products, gardening, pets, orchids among others. It sells second-hand goods on Monday and Tuesday.

House of Museums (บ้านพิพิธภัณฑ์) is a small museum that displays various kind of shops and their everyday items from around 50 years ago. It is located in Muban Khlong Pho Land, Sala Thammasop Road.

References

External links
 Official website of the district (Thai language only)
 BMA website with the tourist landmarks of Thawi Watthana

 
Districts of Bangkok